Emanuel Schreiner (born 2 February 1989) is an Austrian professional footballer who plays for Rheindorf Altach in the Austrian Football Bundesliga.

Career

LASK Linz
Schreiner was a product of the LASK Linz youth academy. He made his first team league debut on 12 July 2008 in a 3-1 away win against SCR Altach. He was subbed off in the 58th minute and replaced by Thomas Piermayr.

Austria Lustenau
In January 2009, Schreiner was loaned out to 1. Liga club SC Austria Lustenau. He made his league debut for the club on 14 July 2009 in a 1-0 home victory over FK Austria Wien II.

SV Ried
Following the conclusion of his loan to Austria Lustenau, Schreiner spent a year with LASK Linz, before being sold to SV Ried. His league debut for the club came on 16 July 2011 in a 1-1 home draw with SK Sturm Graz. He was subbed on for Daniel Royer in the 91st minute.

SCR Altach
In July 2013, Schreiner moved to then 1. Liga club SCR Altach. He made his league debut for the club on 19 July 2013 in a 3-2 home victory over SV Horn. He scored his first league goal for the club on 22 November 2013 in a 4-1 home victory over SC-ESV Parndorf 1919. His goal, the second of the match, came in the 7th minute.

References

External links

Austrian footballers
Austrian Football Bundesliga players
2. Liga (Austria) players
SV Ried players
SC Austria Lustenau players
LASK players
SC Rheindorf Altach players
1989 births
Living people
Association football defenders
People from Steyr
Footballers from Upper Austria